Manami Fujioka (藤岡 麻菜美 born 1 February 1994) is a Japanese professional basketball player.

Career

WJBL
Fujioka began her professional career with the Kashiwa-based JX–ENEOS Sunflowers, for the 2016–17 season.

National Team

Youth Level
Fujioka made her international debut at the 2009 FIBA Asia Under-16 Championship in India where Japan took home the silver medal. She was then named to the team for the 2010 FIBA Under-17 World Championship in France, where Japan finished the tournament in fifth place. In 2012, Fujioka took part in the 2012 FIBA Asia Under-18 Championship, where Japan again placed second and qualified for the World Championship the following year. At the 2013 FIBA Under-19 World Championship in Lithuania, Japan placed eighth.

Senior Level
Fujioka made her debut with the senior national team, at the 2017 FIBA Women's Asia Cup in Bangalore, India.

References

External links

1994 births
Living people
Point guards
Japanese women's basketball players
People from Chiba (city)
Universiade medalists in basketball
Universiade silver medalists for Japan
Medalists at the 2017 Summer Universiade